The Malayan blue-banded kingfisher or Malay blue-banded kingfisher (Alcedo peninsulae), is a species of kingfisher in the subfamily Alcedininae. Its natural habitats are subtropical or tropical moist lowland forest, subtropical or tropical mangrove forest, and rivers. It's a small, rather dark kingfisher. Male is highly distinctive, with a broad blue-green band across a white chest. Female is very different, with an all-orange belly; distinguished from Common Kingfisher by overall duller, darker coloration and the lack of a bright white-and-orange patch behind the eye, its call is piercing similar to the common kingfisher. It is found in Myanmar, the Malay peninsula, Sumatra and Borneo.

References

Alcedo
Birds described in 1941